Flabellobasis capensis is a species of snout moth in the genus Flabellobasis. It is found in South Africa, Ghana, Kenya, Namibia, Réunion and Zimbabwe but has also been recorded from Spain.

The wingspan is about 24 mm.

References

Moths described in 1901
Phycitinae